Salesloft is a sales engagement platform. The company was founded in September 2011. Though its original product offering focused on sales development, the company has since expanded its platform to offer functionality for the entire sales organization.

History
The company's founders, Kyle Porter and David Cummings, met at Georgia Tech's Advanced Technology Development Center and incorporated Salesloft in September 2011. Shortly thereafter, Salesloft graduated from renowned startup accelerator, TechStars, in Boulder, Colorado. The company moved into its new offices in The Atlanta Tech Village in Buckhead, Atlanta. The company continued to grow quickly, surpassing the 100 employee mark in early 2016. By 2020, the company employed over 450 people. The company relocated to its new office in Regions Plaza in Midtown Atlanta in August 2017.

Based in Atlanta, Georgia, with additional offices in San Francisco, New York, London, Singapore and Guadalajara, Mexico, Salesloft has more than 700 employees and was recognized as the #1 best place to work in Atlanta. The company was also named the 7th Fastest-Growing Technology Company in North America by Deloitte. In April 2019, Salesloft raised a $70M venture round, led by Insight Venture Partners.

Leadership 
Kyle Porter, Founder and CEO

Rob Forman, President, COO and Co-founder 

Chad Gold, CFO

Lauren Vaccarello, CMO

Steve Goldberg, CRO

Scott Mitchell, CTO

Ellie Fields, CPO

2018

 Acquired North Carolina startup Noteninja for an undisclosed amount.

2019

 Acquired Indianapolis-based sales assistant software company Costello for an undisclosed amount.

References

External links
Official website

Business intelligence companies